The 1879–80 season was the second season in the history of West Bromwich Albion Football Club. During this period, Albion played their home matches at Cooper's Hill and Dartmouth Park.

Matches

West Bromwich Albion had yet to begin playing competitive football, but did take part in a number of friendly matches throughout the season. The 1–0 win against Black Lake Victoria on 13 December 1879 was for many years Albion's first recorded match, but later that honour was given to the West Bromwich Strollers' match against Hudson's from the previous year. The Black Lake game did nevertheless feature Albion's first recorded goal, scored by Harry Aston in front of 500 spectators. The record of the club's matches during their early years is not complete; of the five matches that were recorded for 1879–80, two are missing the scoreline.

Source for match details:

See also
1879–80 in English football

Footnotes

References 
Citations

Sources

West Bromwich Albion F.C. seasons
West Bromwich Albion